The Discourse on Reforming the Government of Florence (Italian: Discorso sopra il riformare lo stato di Firenze) is a 1520 work by Italian Renaissance political scientist and writer Niccolò Machiavelli.

References

Further reading
 Full Text of the Discourse in Italian, Bibliotheca Philosophica
 Full Text of the Discourse in English, Constitution Society

Works by Niccolò Machiavelli
1520 books